Mario Roshi (born 22 August 1994) is an Albanian footballer who currently plays as a defender for KF Tirana in the Albanian Superliga.

References

External links
 Profile - FSHF

1994 births
Living people
Footballers from Tirana
Albanian footballers
Association football defenders
KF Tirana players
KS Kastrioti players
Kategoria Superiore players
Kategoria e Parë players
Kategoria e Dytë players